Adélaïde Haas Hautval (1 January 1906 – 17 October 1988) was a French physician and psychiatrist who was imprisoned in Auschwitz concentration camp, where she provided medical care for Jewish prisoners and refused to cooperate with Nazi medical experimentation. She was named Righteous Among the Nations in 1965.

Early life
Hautval was born in 1906 in smdLe Hohwald (part of modern Alsace, France). She was the youngest of seven children born to a Protestant minister father. She studied medicine at the University of Strasbourg and trained in psychiatry at various psychiatric facilities in France and Switzerland. In 1938, she returned to Le Hohwald to work in a home for handicapped children, and by 1940, when the German occupation of France began, she was working in a clinic in southwestern France.

Arrest and imprisonment
After learning of her mother's death in Paris in 1942, Hautval sought permission to travel to Nazi-occupied Paris to attend her mother's funeral. When her request was denied, she chose to cross into the German zone illegally; she was arrested and jailed in Bourges with a number of Jewish prisoners. She repeatedly defended the Jewish prisoners to the Gestapo and wore a sign pinned to her clothing reading "friend of the Jews" in the fashion of the yellow badges worn by Jewish prisoners. She was transferred to several transit camps for Jewish deportees, moving through Pithiviers internment camp, Beaune-la-Rolande internment camp and Fort de Romainville before arriving at Auschwitz concentration camp in January 1943 with 230 French women political prisoners, on what became known as Convoi des 31000.

At Auschwitz, chief doctor Eduard Wirths asked Hautval to practice gynaecology; she agreed until she discovered that medical experiments were being performed on Jewish women with the intention of sterilizing them through the use of x-rays or surgical removal of the ovaries. In her barracks, she was known as "the saint" because of the medical care she provided to Jewish prisoners in secret. She was transferred to Ravensbrück concentration camp in August 1944, where she stayed until it was liberated by the Allies in April 1945.

Later life and legacy
After being liberated from Ravensbrück, Hautval returned to her medical practice in France. She gave evidence in the 1964 Dering v Uris libel trial, in which Wladislaw Dering sued the novelist Leon Uris for naming him as one of the doctors performing medical experiments at Auschwitz. While Dering claimed that doctors who refused to comply with Nazi experiments would have been killed, Hautval testified that she had rejected orders from Auschwitz officials and had still survived. The British judge presiding over the trial, Justice Frederick Lawton, described Hautval as "perhaps one of most impressive and courageous women who had ever given evidence in the courts of this country". In 1965, she was honoured by Yad Vashem as Righteous Among the Nations.

Hautval committed suicide in 1988 after her diagnosis of Parkinson disease. Her memoirs, which she had completed in 1987, were published posthumously in 1991 under the title Médecine et crimes contre l'humanité (Medicine and Crimes Against Humanity). In 1993, the street facing the University of Strasbourg's medical clinics was renamed after Hautval. In 2015,  in Paris was renamed in her memory.

See also
Convoi des 31000

References

1906 births
1988 deaths
Physicians from Strasbourg
20th-century French physicians
French women psychiatrists
French Resistance members
French Righteous Among the Nations
Auschwitz concentration camp survivors
Ravensbrück concentration camp survivors
University of Strasbourg alumni
1988 suicides
20th-century French women
People with Parkinson's disease
Suicides in France